Mike Murphy is a former Republican member of the Illinois House of Representatives for the 99th district. The 99th district, located in the Springfield metropolitan area, includes the majority of the state's capitol Springfield as well as the communities of Auburn, Berlin, Chatham, Curran, Divernon, Leland Grove, New Berlin, and Thayer.

Murphy defeated Democratic candidate and retired Illinois State Police master sergeant Marc Bell in the 2018 general election. In the 2020 election, Murphy was unopposed.

On November 30, 2021, Murphy announced effective at 11:59 PM, he would resign from his position in the legislature. The next day, Murphy began his new role as the president and chief executive officer of the Greater Springfield Chamber of Commerce. A committee made up of the Sangamon County Republican chairwoman and two precinct committeepersons appointed Sandy Hamilton to the vacancy.

Murphy, the past owner of Charlie Parker's Diner, served on Divernon School Board and the Divernon Village Board prior to his election to the State House.

Electoral history

References

External links
Representative Mike Murphy (R) 99th District at the Illinois General Assembly
101st
Campaign website

21st-century American politicians
Republican Party members of the Illinois House of Representatives
People from Sangamon County, Illinois
Living people
Year of birth missing (living people)